Choi Jeong Hwa (Korean: 최정화, born 1961 in Seoul) is an artist and designer whose work moves between the disciplines of visual art, graphic design, industrial design and architecture. His inspiration comes from popular culture and day-to-day life. Large-scale outdoor sculptures crafted from diverse materials such as consumer goods, balloons, wires, as well as recycled and found objects are the hallmarks of Choi's playful repertoire.

His White Lotus, a two-meter high flower made of inflatable polystyrene, was exhibited at the Venice Biennale in 2005.

Life
His father was a soldier as well as a secretary for a famous buddhist monk, and while he traveled with his father he learned about the honest aspect of religion as well as the harsh side of reality. He started drawing since the last year of high school. He majored in Western art styles at Hongik University.From 1991, Choi set the phrase "Art that survives in the streets, and not in an art gallery, is real art."

References

1961 births
South Korean sculptors
South Korean contemporary artists
Artists from Seoul
Living people
Hongik University alumni